Świerkocin is a village in the administrative district of Gmina Grudziądz, within Grudziądz County, Kuyavian-Pomeranian Voivodeship, in north-central Poland.

History
During the German occupation of Poland (World War II), Świerkocin was one of the sites of executions of Poles, carried out by the Germans in 1939 as part of the Intelligenzaktion.

References

Villages in Grudziądz County